Eufrosina Popescu (October 20, 1821, Bucharest–1900, Fetești) was a Wallachian, later Romanian stage actor. She belonged to the first generation of professional actors in Romania.

A native of Bucharest, her parents were the boyar Vlasto and his wife Maria. At the age of sixteen, she married the army officer Theodor Popescu. She studied music and acting at Societatea filarmonică, the first dramatic school in Romania, established by Costache Aristia, the pioneer and founder of the Romanian theater, in 1833. Alongside Costache Caragiale, she belonged to the first generation of professional actors educated there, and active in Romania. She performed parts within the Romanian drama of Vasile Alecsandri, V.A. Urechia, Gheorghe Sion and Alexandru Macedonski, as well as classical international plays. Under the name Eufrosina Marcolini, she also toured Europe, especially Italy, where she became quite popular. After the 1859 Union of the Principalities, she returned home. There, she appeared on stage, successively, with Mihail Pascaly and Matei Millo.

Notes

References
 , Dicționar Enciclopedic Român, Editura Politică, București, 1962–1964
 , Dicţionar Enciclopedic Român, Editura Politică, București, 1962–1964
 Enciclopedia Minerva, Cluj, 1929
 Predescu, Lucian – Enciclopedia României. Cugetarea, Editura Saeculum, București, 1999 

1821 births
1900 deaths
Romanian stage actresses
19th-century Romanian actresses